In 4-dimensional topology, a branch of mathematics, Rokhlin's theorem states that if a smooth, orientable, closed 4-manifold M has a spin structure (or, equivalently, the second Stiefel–Whitney class  vanishes), then the signature of its intersection form, a quadratic form on the second cohomology group , is divisible by 16. The theorem is named for Vladimir Rokhlin, who proved it in 1952.

Examples
The intersection form on M

By a theorem of Cahit Arf, any even unimodular lattice has signature divisible by 8, so Rokhlin's theorem forces one extra factor of 2 to divide the signature.
A K3 surface is compact, 4 dimensional, and  vanishes, and the signature is −16, so 16 is the best possible number in Rokhlin's theorem.
It has signature , which can be seen from Friedrich Hirzebruch's signature theorem. The case  gives back the last example of a K3 surface.
Michael Freedman's E8 manifold is a simply connected compact topological manifold with vanishing  and intersection form  of signature 8. Rokhlin's theorem implies that this manifold has no smooth structure. This manifold shows that Rokhlin's theorem fails for the set of merely topological (rather than smooth) manifolds.
This is not true in general: an Enriques surface is a compact smooth 4 manifold and has even intersection form II1,9 of signature −8 (not divisible by 16), but the class  does not vanish and is represented by a torsion element in the second cohomology group.

Proofs
Rokhlin's theorem can be deduced from the fact that the third stable homotopy group of spheres  is cyclic of order 24; this is Rokhlin's original approach.

It can also be deduced from the Atiyah–Singer index theorem. See Â genus and Rochlin's theorem.

 gives a geometric proof.

The Rokhlin invariant
Since Rokhlin's theorem states that the signature of a spin smooth manifold is divisible by 16, the definition of the Rokhlin invariant is deduced as follows:

For example, the Poincaré homology sphere bounds a spin 4-manifold with intersection form , so its Rokhlin invariant is 1.

More generally, if N is a spin 3-manifold (for example, any  homology sphere), then the signature of any spin 4-manifold M with boundary N is well defined mod 16, and is called the Rokhlin invariant of N. On a topological 3-manifold N, the generalized Rokhlin invariant refers to the function whose domain is the spin structures on N, and which evaluates to the Rokhlin invariant of the pair  where s is a spin structure on N.

The Rokhlin invariant of M is equal to half the Casson invariant mod 2. The Casson invariant is viewed as the Z-valued lift of the Rokhlin invariant of integral homology 3-sphere.

Generalizations
The Kervaire–Milnor theorem  states that if  is a characteristic sphere in a smooth compact 4-manifold M, then 
 .
A characteristic sphere is an embedded 2-sphere whose homology class represents the Stiefel–Whitney class . If  vanishes, we can take  to be any small sphere, which has self intersection number 0, so Rokhlin's theorem follows.

The Freedman–Kirby theorem  states that if  is a characteristic surface in a smooth compact 4-manifold M, then 
.
This Arf invariant is obviously 0 if  is a sphere, so the Kervaire–Milnor theorem is a special case.

A generalization of the Freedman-Kirby theorem to topological (rather than smooth) manifolds states that
,
where  is the Kirby–Siebenmann invariant of M. The Kirby–Siebenmann invariant of M is 0 if M is smooth.

Armand Borel and Friedrich Hirzebruch proved the following theorem: If X is a smooth compact spin manifold of dimension divisible by 4 then the Â genus is an integer, and is even if the dimension of X is 4 mod 8. This can be deduced from the Atiyah–Singer index theorem: Michael Atiyah and Isadore Singer showed that the Â genus is the index of the Atiyah–Singer operator, which is always integral, and is even in dimensions 4 mod 8. For a 4-dimensional manifold, the Hirzebruch signature theorem shows that the signature is −8 times the Â genus, so in dimension 4 this implies Rokhlin's theorem.

 proved that if X is a compact oriented smooth spin manifold of dimension 4 mod 8, then its signature is divisible by 16.

References
 Freedman, Michael; Kirby, Robion, "A geometric proof of Rochlin's theorem", in: Algebraic and geometric topology (Proc. Sympos. Pure Math., Stanford Univ., Stanford, Calif., 1976), Part 2, pp. 85–97, Proc. Sympos. Pure Math., XXXII, Amer. Math. Soc., Providence, R.I., 1978.  
 
 Kervaire, Michel A.; Milnor, John W., "Bernoulli numbers, homotopy groups, and a theorem of Rohlin", 1960 Proc. Internat. Congress Math. 1958, pp. 454–458, Cambridge University Press, New York. 
 Kervaire, Michel A.; Milnor, John W., On 2-spheres in 4-manifolds. Proc. Natl. Acad. Sci. U.S.A. 47 (1961), 1651-1657. 
 {{cite journal |last1=Matsumoto |first1=Yoichirou |title=An elementary proof of Rochlin's signature theorem and its extension by Guillou and Marin |date=1986 |url=https://www.maths.ed.ac.uk/~v1ranick/papers/matumoto5.pdf |ref=https://www.semanticscholar.org/paper/An-elementary-proof-of-Rochlins-signature-theorem-Matsumoto/ace0e29960824a5d10923f06f04f46ec285f03a1 |language=en}}
  (especially page 280)
 Ochanine, Serge, "Signature modulo 16, invariants de Kervaire généralisés et nombres caractéristiques dans la K-théorie réelle", Mém. Soc. Math. France 1980/81, no. 5, 142 pp. 
 Rokhlin, Vladimir A., New results in the theory of four-dimensional manifolds'', Doklady Acad. Nauk. SSSR (N.S.) 84 (1952) 221–224. 
 .

Geometric topology
4-manifolds
Differential structures
Surgery theory
Theorems in topology